Sumpia is Indonesian traditional lumpia spring roll with much drier and smaller shape. Its diameter is about the same as human finger. Just like another Indonesian lumpia, sumpia consists of beef or prawn floss as filling in a lumpia wrapper, spiced with coriander, lemon leaf, garlic and shallot.

In Indonesia, the most common filling for sumpia is ebi or dried shrimp floss.

See also

Cuisine of Indonesia
List of Indonesian snacks
Lumpia
Lumpia semarang
Spring roll

References

Appetizers
Indonesian cuisine
Javanese cuisine
Kue